Thabana Ntlenyana is the highest mountain in southern Africa, located in the Drakensburg mountain range. The name means "beautiful little mountain" in the Sesotho language.

Thabana Ntlenyanai is situated on the Mohlesi ridge, north of the treacherous Sani Pass. The peak is climbed as part of a "Grand Traverse" of the Drakensberg, which are a large system of mountain ranges that often includes this peak and the Maloti Mountains.

The peak is often climbed from Sani Top Chalet or from Vergelegen Nature Reserve.

Resources
 Fresh Water Ecoregions of the World
 Guided Trekking of Thabana Ntlenyana

References 

Drakensberg
Highest points of countries